Gogrial State was a state in South Sudan that existed between 2 October 2015 and 22 February 2020. It was located in the Bahr el Ghazal region and it bordered Twic to the north, Aweil East to the northwest, Aweil to the west, Wau to the southwest, Tonj to the southeast, and Northern Liech to the northeast.

Gogrial Akuol Is divided into 5 sections. Awan Mou,Awan Chan,Kuac Ayok, Aguok Mou, & Apuk Giir Thiik

History

On 2 October 2015, President Salva Kiir issued a decree establishing 28 states in place of the 10 constitutionally established states. The decree established the new states largely along ethnic lines. A number of opposition parties and civil society groups challenged the constitutionality of the decree. Kiir later resolved to take it to parliament for approval as a constitutional amendment. In November the South Sudanese parliament empowered President Kiir to create new states. Gogrial State was created from part of the former Warrap State.

Abraham Gum Makuach was appointed Governor on 24 December 2015. Akec Tong Aleu, the previous governor, became governor of Tonj state after the division into 28 states, paving the way for the appointment of Makuach.

In February 2016, there were nine cabinet positions, including Governor and Deputy Governor. The state is required to have 21 legislators appointed to the state assembly.

Gogrial State is the home state of President Salva Kiir.

Administrative divisions
After the split up, Gogrial State broke down even further for a total of 13 counties by Governor Makuach, which were created in February 2016: Two new additional counties were created later on to bring the total of 15. The 15 counties are part of the 180 counties in South Sudan. The 15 counties are consisted of the following:

 Former Gogrial East County:
 Apuk East; headquarters: Lietnhom
 Apuk North; headquarters: Nyang-Jur
 Apuk South; headquarters: Pindit
 Apuk West; headquarters: Ajogo
 Former Gogrial West County:
 Aguok Centre; headquarters: Alek
 Aguok North; headquarters: Mayom-Kadaduet
 Aguok South; headquarters: Gogrial Town
 Aguok West; headquarters: Keet
 Awan Chan; headquarters: Akon
 Awan Pajook; headquarters: Mayen Pajok
 Awan Riau; headquarters: Pan-liet
 Kuac East; headquarters: Ajiep
 Kuac North; headquarters: Malual-Monyjoc or Karic
 Kuac South; headquarters: Yienh-Liet or Ajep
 Kuac West; headquarters: Mayom-Ariech

Nine of the counties are in Gogrial West and four are in Gogrial East. Makuach's plan received criticism as the Council of States recommended no more than eight counties per state.

References

Bahr el Ghazal
States of South Sudan